The Harbour Town Lighthouse is a lighthouse at the Harbour Town Marina at Hilton Head Island, South Carolina. It was privately built and is a private aid to navigation.  Although initially ridiculed by local residents during the planning and construction phases, the lighthouse became instantly popular and is today the most recognizable symbol of Hilton Head Island and Sea Pines Resort.  The annually televised The Heritage golf tournament has helped increase the lighthouse's fame to millions of golf fans worldwide, and the 18th hole at the Harbour Town Golf Links has become one of the most popular and recognizable finishing holes in golf.

History
Building of Harbour Town Lighthouse was started in 1969 by Charles Fraser and completed in 1970. It is a octagonal column with a red observation deck or gallery below the lantern. Its daymark is alternating red and white bands. It has a white light that flashes every 25 s.

The lighthouse was privately built as part of Harbour Town Marina and Sea Pines Plantation. It is open for the public to climb. There is a small fee for a day pass to the Plantation and another small fee for admission to its lighthouse.

Current
The Harbour Town Lighthouse is now a tourist and wedding destination for Hilton Head Island. The privately owned lighthouse also features a museum with historic photos of Harbour Town, and gift shops at the bottom and top of the light.

References

External links
 Harbour Town Lighthouse - official site
 Sea Pines Plantation - Harbour Town, including Harbour Town Light

Lighthouses in South Carolina
Buildings and structures in Beaufort County, South Carolina
Tourist attractions in Beaufort County, South Carolina